This is a list of characters in the Transformers Generation 1 comics series.

Non-Transformer characters

A
 Aunty - The Autobots computer on board the Ark.

B
 Walter Barnett - US government official and friend of the Autobots. Originally suspicious of the Autobots, Barnett became convinced they were friendly after seeing they chose not to fight back when attacked by humans. Barnett saved the lives of the Throttlebots by transferring their "brains" to toy cars before their bodies were destroyed.
 Berko - Originally a homeless man, abducted into the Cosmic Carnival. Eventually becomes the Cosmic Carnival's ringmaster.
 B'ghdad - Crime lord. He appears in a Matrix Quest story based on the film The Maltese Falcon.
 Big Top - Owner of the Cosmic Carnival.
 G. B. Blackrock - Millionaire and friend of the Autobots. Blackrock owns several companies, most prominently a chain of gas stations. He is a bit of a playboy and likes to flaunt his riches. Following an attack by the current Decepticon commander, Shockwave, at one of his seabound oil refineries, one of Blackrock's workers, Josie Beller, was crippled. Feeling responsible for her neurological injuries, Blackrock swore revenge on the Transformers by developing an anti-robot weapon. Later, though, Blackrock joins the Autobots. In the latter part of the series, Blackrock founded a team of human superheroes called the Neo-Knights. Blackrock himself does not have super powers, he simply acts as the team's manager. In the ReGeneration One comics by IDW Publishing, two decades of constant war against the Decepticons has forced Blackrock to abandon his millionaire playboy lifestyle and become a survivalist warrior, joining Spike Witwicky's resistance group against the Decepticons. The war has disabled Blackrock, leaving him requiring a mobile chair device, similar to the wheelchair-using Professor Charles Xavier. Blackrock also has a Shattered Glass counterpart by the name of R.J. Blackrock.

C
 Carissa Carr - Science fiction film actress. Carr played the lead female character in a movie, where the Decepticon Pretender Skullgrin was chosen as the main villain. This led to an enormously successful movie career for Skullgrin, but it ended abruptly when Circuit Breaker discovered he was a robot and attacked him.
 Charlene - Woman who accidentally became Skids's friend.

D
 Jake Dalrymple - Short-tempered man.
 Death's Head - A robotic bounty hunter (or rather, as he calls himself, a "freelance peace-keeping agent").

F
 Miss Fatale - Resourceful female adventurer. She appears in a Matrix Quest story based on the film The Maltese Falcon.
 Charlie Fong - Scientist. Fong helped the Autobots Goldbug and Blaster survive an infection of Scraplets.

G
 Galen Kord - A Nebulan who preceded Spike Witwicky as the biological binary-bonded partner of Fortress Maximus. Like the other Nebulan partners of the Headmasters, Galen was binary-bonded to Fortress Maximus already on Nebulos, before the Nebulan council drove all the Transformers and their Nebulan partners off their homeworld. Galen had a romantic interest with Llyra, Lord Zarak's daughter, but was forced to abandon it after both he and Zarak (binary-bonded to Scorponok) were driven off Nebulos. Galen was killed by Scorponok inside a mountain cave on Earth, inviting Spike Witwicky to succeed him. Unlike all other Nebulan partners appearing in the comics, Galen was never produced as a toy.
 Gutt - Crime lord. He appears in a Matrix Quest story based on the film The Maltese Falcon.

H
 Hook, Line and Sinker - Assassins created by Unicron. They originally were three minor criminals from the planet Ghennix. As Unicron devoured the planet, he reformatted the criminals into three powerful assassins to serve as Galvatron's assistants. However, Galvatron betrayed his master and killed Hook, Line and Sinker.

J
 Jake "Jackhammer" Jackson - Professional wrestler. He participated in a couple of wrestling matches against the Autobot Micromaster Roadhandler. His nickname comes from his use of a real jackhammer in the ring.
 J'Oh - Bartender. He serves as the bartender of the Central Space Station and is decidedly unfriendly to robots, whom he refuses to serve anything.

L
 Llyra - Lord Zarak's daughter. In love with Galen Kord, Llyra was torn between two devotions. Llyra was left heartbroken on Nebulos as both her father and her lover were forced to depart, having affiliated themselves with opposing sides.

M
 Mecannibals - A race of robots that eat other robots. These bright red, spherical robots live on a spaceship in orbit around the Central Space Station. The Autobot Sky Lynx was captured by them and about to be eaten, but he was rescued by the Pretenders Cloudburst and Landmine.
 The Mechanic - Notorious car thief. The Mechanic's criminal career underwent a huge improvement after he accidentally stole the Autobot Ratchet, who he thought was just a normal ambulance. This gave the Mechanic access to the Ark's technology, which he used to fit various weapons into stolen cars. His criminal career was finally put to an end by a co-operation with the Autobot Blaster and the local police.

N
 Neo-Knights - Team of four superheroes.
 Circuit Breaker (Josie Beller). Invented a kind of bodysuit with embedded circuits that allowed her to move her body after a spinal cord injury, disrupt the circuits of electronic devices and Transformers, and fly.
 Dynamo (Hector Dialonzo). Can channel the force of the Earth itself and use it to his advantage.
 Rapture (Katrina Vesotzky). Can project images into a person's or other animal's or even a robot's mind, causing him/her to dream and forget the real situation.
 Thunderpunch (Lee Gruber). Has tremendous strength.

O
 "O" - Buster Witwicky's friend. "O", whose real name has not been mentioned, only appeared in the very early issues. He usually likes to hang out with Buster and his girlfriend Jessie.

R
 Roadjammers - Group of four vigilantes.
 Robot-Master - Comic book figure and actor.
 Rorza - Stunt driver. A very minor character, Rorza's only appearance was as a stunt driver in the Cosmic Carnival, where he tried to stop Sky Lynx and Berko from escaping.

S
 Cecilia Santiago - Talk show host. A fairly minor character, she presented a talk show where the Autobot Micromaster Roadhandler appeared as a guest during his career as a professional wrestler.
 Scraplets - Robotic parasites. Scraplets are semi-sentient robotic lifeforms, about five centimetres tall. Like the Transformers, they can transform between two modes: from various humanoid or animal modes to nuts or bolts. Scraplets feed on other robotic lifeforms, fastening themselves in the host robot's armour plating using some kind of corrosive agent. Using the raw materials of the host, a Scraplet can multiply itself, creating more Scraplets. The Scraplets' only weakness is water. When doused with water, a Scraplet loosens its grip on the host, allowing it to be safely destroyed without harming the host. In Transformers Prime, Scraplets are considered to be Cybertron's most dangerous form of vermin and resemble small orbs similar in size to a soccer ball with eight pairs of legs, a mill of razor-sharp teeth, and the ability to fly in pursuit of prey. As mentioned by Bulkhead and Ratchet, they travel in large swarms and can dismantle large transformers in minutes as was seen in "Orion Pax: Part 3" when they were used by Jack Darby to kill an Insecticon. Unlike their G1 counterparts, Scraplets in Transformers Prime cannot transform, and have a severe weakness to extreme cold; being easily dispatched by Jack Darby's fire extinguisher and the subzero temperatures of the Arctic where they were lured to by Bulkhead in "Scrapheap".
 Soriza - Nebulan council member.
 Spider-Man - Human superhero. In issue #3 Spider-Man was sent by S.H.I.E.L.D to find Gears and help the Autobots to fight the Decepticons. After fighting the Decepticons, Optimus Prime tells Spider-Man it is the Autobots' fight and very dangerous. Spider-Man accepts and leaves.

W
 Witwicky family - The oldest friends of the Autobots.
 Spike Witwicky - Buster's older brother and husband of Carly Witwicky.
 Sparkplug Witwicky - Father of Spike and Buster. Grandfather of Daniel.
 Buster Witwicky - The first Witwicky introduced. 
 Daniel Witwicky (cameo) - Son of Spike, like his animated counterpart, though he was once portrayed as Buster's son.
 Jessie Witwicky - Buster's girlfriend. In one story, she married Buster and had a son named Daniel.

Z
 Ethan Zachary - Computer programmer. The owner and chief software architect of a computer games company. It was in his company that Optimus Prime and Megatron fought in a virtual battle, ending with the apparent death of Optimus Prime. However, Zachary had saved Optimus Prime's mind on a floppy disk, and he was later resurrected as a Powermaster.

Transformers

A
 Aerialbots/Superion
 Air Raid
 Fireflight
 Silverbolt
 Skydive
 Slingshot
 Autobot Headmasters
 Brainstorm with Arcana
 Chromedome with Stylor
 Fortress Maximus
 Cerebros with Spike Witwicky
 Cog and Galen
 Hardhead with Duros
 Highbrow with Gort
 Hosehead with Lug
 Nightbeat with Muzzle
 Siren with Quig
 Autobot Micromasters
 Off Road Patrol
 Highjump
 Mudslinger
 Powertrain
 Tote
 Race Car Patrol
 Free Wheeler
 Roadhandler
 Swindler
 Tailspin
 Rescue Patrol
 Fixit
 Red Hot
 Seawatch
 Stakeout
 Autobot Powermasters
 Getaway with Rev
 Joyride with Hotwire
 Slapdash with Lube
 Autobot Pretenders
 Cloudburst
 Crossblades
 Doubleheader
 Groundbreaker
 Landmine
 Longtooth
 Pincher
 Splashdown
 Waverider
 Autobot Targetmasters
 Blurr with Haywire
 Crosshairs with Pinpointer
 Hot Rod/Rodimus Prime with Firebolt
 Kup with Recoil
 Landfill with Flintlock and Silencer
 Pointblank with Peacemaker
 Quickmix with Boomer and Ricochet
 Scoop with Holepunch and Tracer
 Sureshot with Spoilsport

B
Barricade
 Battlechargers
 Runabout
 Runamuck
 Beachcomber
 Bluestreak
 Blaster
 Boltax - Seen in a video recording from millions of years ago as a guardian of the Underbase.
 Brawn
 Bumblebee/Goldbug
 Buzzsaw
 Bombshell
 Breakdown
 Bonecrusher
 Blurr
 Brawl
 Blackwall - Seen in The Transformers: Primacy as a hulking Decepticon
  [Breakaway/Getaway

C
Chromedome
 Cliffjumper
 Combaticons/Bruticus
 Blast Off
 Brawl
 Onslaught
 Swindle
 Vortex
 Constructicons/Devastator
 Bonecrusher
 Hook
 Long Haul
 Mixmaster
 Scavenger
 Scrapper
 Cosmos

D
 Decepticon Headmasters
 Fangry with Brisko
 Horri-Bull with Kreb
 Scorponok with Zarak
 Skullcruncher with Grax
 Squeezeplay with Lokos
 Weirdwolf with Monzo
 Decepticon Justice Division - a group of Decepticons who exist to hunt down traitors to the group.
 Tarn - leader of the Justice Division.
 Vos
 Kaon
 Tesarus
 Helex
 The Pet
 Nickel - a female medic who maintains the members of the Justice Division.
 Decepticon Micromasters
 Air Strike Patrol
 Nightflight
 Storm Cloud
 Tailwind
 Whisper
 Sports Car Patrol
 Blackjack
 Detour
 Hyperdrive
 Road Hugger
 Decepticon Powermasters
 Dreadwing
 Darkwing with Throttle
 Decepticon Pretenders
 Bludgeon
 Bomb-Burst
 Carnivac
 Finback
 Iguanus
 Octopunch
 Skullgrin
 Snarler
 Stranglehold
 Submarauder
 Thunderwing
 Decepticon Targetmasters
 Cyclonus with Nightstick
 Needlenose with Sunbeam and Zig-Zag
 Quake with Tiptop and Heater
 Scourge with Fracas
 Spinister with Hairsplitter and Singe 
 Triggerhappy/Triggershot with Blowpipe
 Decepticon Triple Changers
 Astrotrain
 Blitzwing
 Destructons - a team introduced in Blackthorne Publishing's Transformers: 3-D, and later reintroduced in BotCon storyline for 2014.
Lord Imperious Delirious-dragon-like leader of the Destructons.
Medusa - Naga-like female Destructon.
Bruton - A massive, powerful Destructon warrior.
Psychokhan - a centaur-like Destructon.
 Dinobots
 Grimlock
 Slag
 Sludge
 Snarl
 Swoop

F
 Firecons
 Cindersaur
 Flamefeather
 Sparkstalker

G
 Galvatron-One of the Leaders of the Decepticons usually an upgraded Megatron,a future version of Megatron, or a separate entity from Megatron
 Gears
 Grapple

H
 Hoist
 Horrorcons
 Apeface with Spasma
 Snapdragon with Krunk
 Huffer
Hot Rod

I
 Inferno
 Insecticons
 Bombshell
 Kickback
 Shrapnel
 Ironhide 
 Impactor - Leader of the Wreckers

J
 Jazz
 Jetfire
 Jhiaxus

K
 The Keeper - Ancient being watching over Primus's slumber. The Autobot Pretender Classics met him in the centre of Cybertron. The story where the Keeper appears is the first appearance of Primus in the American Transformers comic.

L
 Laserbeak
 Last Autobot - Legendary Autobot warrior, later identified by the name Autonomous Maximus. The Transformers equivalent of a king asleep in mountain, he has been dormant in the centre of Cybertron for millions of years, until he was finally called upon to defeat the Decepticons at Klo. This story marks the end of the American G1 Transformers comic.
 Lord Straxus- Former Decepticon leader and would-be rival of Megatron.

M
 Maccadam - A mysterious Transformer who runs Maccadam's Old Oil House on Cybertron and who keeps his identity concealed from the various patrons; he is thought by some to be a member of the Thirteen Primes. The oil house would be featured in several comics and an episode of Transformers: Animated, and Maccadam himself would later appear in his establishment in the novel Transformers: Retribution. This Maccadam is described as an older Cybertronian with a short but strong body decorated with purple and gold armor and sporting a goatee. Wheeljack recognized him as the robot who always played the piano in the oil house, and Maccadam was revealed to be the center of Ultra Magnus' spy network in the Decepticon-held Iacon.
 Megatron
 Metroplex
 Mirage
 Motormaster
 Moonracer
 Mixmaster
 Misfire
 Mudslinger

O
Octane
 Omega Supreme
 Optimus Prime, revived as a Powermaster (with Hi-Q) and again as an Action Master.
Orion Pax

P
 Perceptor
 Powerglide
 Predacons/Predaking
 Divebomb
 Headstrong
 Razorclaw
 Rampage
 Tantrum
 Protectobots/Defensor
 Blades
 First Aid
 Groove
 Hot Spot
 Streetwise 
 Prowl
 Prima
 Primus

R
 Rack & Ruin
 Ratbat
 Ratchet
 Ravage
 Rumble and Frenzy
 Red Alert
 Rodimus Prime

S
 Sandstorm
 Scrounge
 Seacons/Piranacon
 Nautilator
 Overbite
 Seawing
 Skalor
 Snaptrap
 Tentakil
 Seaspray
 Seekers
 Dirge
 Ramjet
 Skywarp
 Starscream
 Thrust
 Thundercracker
 Sentinel Prime
Scorponok
 Shockwave
 Sideswipe
 Sixshot
 Skids
 Sky Lynx
 Slamdance
 Grand Slam
 Raindance
 Slugslinger
 Smokescreen
 Soundwave
 Soundblaster
 Sparkabots
 Fizzle
 Guzzle
 Sizzle
 Streetwise
 Sparkstalker
 Speedstream
 Spinister
 Stockade - an enforcer back on Cybertron; threatening neutral Cybertronians to stay neutral or punishing them. He was one of the Decepticons who was brought to Earth by Starscream and the other surviving Decepticons. According to the biography printed in the collected Reign of Starscream books Stockade is a thug who relished his job as forman of a Decepticon work gang.
 Stunticons/Menasor
 Breakdown
 Dead End
 Drag Strip
 Motormaster
 Wildrider
 Sunstreaker

T
 Technobots/Computron
 Afterburner
 Lightspeed
 Nosecone
 Scattorshot
 Strafe
 Terrorcons/Abominus
 Blot
 Cutthroat
 Hun-Gurrr
 Rippersnapper
 Sinnertwin
 Throttlebots
 Chase
 Freeway
 Rollbar
 Searchlight
 Wideload
 Tracks
 Trailbreaker
 Triggerbots
 Backstreet
 Dogfight
 Override
 Triggercons
 Crankcase
 Ruckus
 Windsweeper
 Trypticon with Wipe-Out

U
 Unicron - Dark god and planet eater.

W
 Warpath
 Windcharger
 Windblade
 Wing
 Wheeljack
 Wreckers
 Topspin
 Twin-twist
 Whirl
 Roadbuster
 Springer
 Broadside
 Sandstorm
 Rack & Ruin
 Impactor

X
 Emirate Xaaron - Autobot chieftain. Created by Simon Furman and first appeared in the UK comic. His first US comic appearance was as a leader of an Autobot rebel squad trying to overthrow Decepticon suppression. This drew him deeper and deeper into the secrets of Cybertron's past, until he finally became an avatar of the god Primus.

References

Comics
Transformers
Characters